NABL may refer to:
National Alliance of Basketball Leagues, American organisation
North American League (baseball), official name North American Baseball League, American organisation
National Athletic Basketball League, defunct American basketball league
North American Basketball League, American minor league basketball organization founded in 2016.
National Accreditation Board for Testing and Calibration Laboratories an autonomous body under Department for Promotion of Industry and Internal Trade, Government of India

See also
Kafr Nabl, a city in Syria